Claire Wegink (born 29 September 1967) is a former professional tennis player from the Netherlands.

Biography
Wegink, who comes from Tiel, began competing on the professional tour in the late 1980s. 

She reached her career-high ranking of 118 in the world in 1993, after making the round of 16 at WTA Tour tournaments that year in Barcelona, Birmingham and Rome. 

At Grand Slam level, her best performances were second-round appearances at the 1993 US Open and 1994 Wimbledon Championships.

ITF finals

Singles (0–7)

Doubles (9–3)

References

External links
 
 

1967 births
Living people
Dutch female tennis players
People from Tiel
Sportspeople from Gelderland
20th-century Dutch women
21st-century Dutch women